Zahid Ahmed can refer to:

 Zahid Ahmed (actor) (born 1984), Pakistani actor
 Zahid Ahmed (Pakistani cricketer) (born 1961), Pakistani cricketer
 Zahid Ahmad (Afghan cricketer) (born 2003), Afghan cricketer